D. Broadus Keele Jr., also known simply as Don Keele or D. B. Keele Jr., is an American audio engineer and inventor who has helped shape and influence the professional and consumer loudspeaker industries since the early seventies. He is one of the developers of the constant directivity horn design with several patents of Bi-radial horns from companies like JBL, and Electrovoice.

Keele is a Fellow of the Audio Engineering Society and has published more than forty technical papers on subjects including speaker boxes, speaker horns, electrical circuits, computer and calculator aided design, anechoic chambers, interaural crosstalk, and Constant Beamwidth Transducers (CBT loudspeakers). Keele has won several awards including an Academy Award for Technical Achievement for his contribution to Constant Directivity loudspeaker systems in the cinema. In 2020, Keele was inducted in the TEC Awards' TECnology Hall of Fame.

Awards and Recognitions

Audio Engineering Society 
1975 Publications Award 

1979 Fellowship 

2016 Gold Medal Award (formerly The John H. Potts Memorial Award)

TEF/Goldline 
2001 Richard C. Heyser TEF Award

Association of Loudspeaker Manufacturing and Acoustics (ALMA) 
2011 The Beryllium Driver Award for Lifetime Achievement

References 

Living people
American audio engineers
Academy Award for Technical Achievement winners
20th-century American inventors
Year of birth missing (living people)